Möng Kyawt, also known as Mongkyawt is a village in Mong Ton Township of Mongsat District, Shan State, eastern Burma (Myanmar).

Geography
Möng Kyawt is located in a mountainous area; Loi Hkilek, a 1,973 m high mountain is located about 11 km to the northeast of Möng Kyawt.

History
At the time of the Shan States this town was the capital of Mongkyawt District, its actual elevation is 1,973 m. together with  Möng Tang, Möng Hang and Möng Hta, one of the four trans-Salween districts of Mongpan State formerly claimed by Thailand as unlawfully occupied by British Burma.

After having occupied parts of Burma, the Japanese Empire agreed to the Thai annexation of Kengtung State and the trans-Salween areas claimed by Thailand. The Thai army evacuated the Shan States only in August 1945.

Bibliography

References

External links
Maplandia World Gazetteer

Populated places in Mongsat District
Mong Ton Township